Empress Xiaominrang (孝愍讓皇后; 1378–1402), of the Ma clan, was the empress consort to the Jianwen Emperor and the second empress consort of China's Ming dynasty.

Biography
Born in 1378, Ma was the daughter of an official from the town of Yingtian in modern Nanjing named Ma Quan (馬全). She married Zhu Yunwen, grandson of the Hongwu Emperor, and was proclaimed consort of the Imperial Grandson-heir in 1395.

Zhu Yunmen ascended the throne in 1398 and Ma was instated as the empress consort in the second month of his reign. She had two sons, Zhu Wenkui, Crown Prince Hejian and Zhu Wengui, Prince Huai of Run, both posthumously honored.

In 1402, Zhu Di sacked Nanjing and set fire to the palace, where Empress Ma died.

Titles
During the reign of the Hongwu Emperor (r. 1368–1398):
Lady Ma (馬氏; from 1378)
Consort of the Imperial Grandson (皇太孙妃; from 1395)
During the reign of the Jianwen Emperor (r. 1398–1402):
Empress (皇后; from 30 June 1398)
During the reign of the Hongguang Emperor (r. 1644–1645):
Empress Xiàomǐn Wēnzhēn Zhéruì Sùliè Xiāngtiān Bìshèng Ràng (孝愍溫貞哲睿肅烈襄天弼聖讓皇后; from 1644)

Issue
As consort of the Imperial Grandson-heir:
Zhu Wenkui, Crown Prince Hejian (和簡皇太子 朱文奎; 30 November 1396 – 1402), the Jianwen Emperor's first son
As empress:
Zhu Wengui, Prince Huai of Run (潤懷王 朱文圭; 1401–1457), the Jianwen Emperor's second son

In popular culture
Portrayed by Leung Ka-ki Relic of an Emissary (2011)

References

Citations

Sources 
 Works cited

 

1378 births
1402 deaths
Ming dynasty empresses
14th-century Chinese women
14th-century Chinese people
15th-century Chinese women
15th-century Chinese people
People from Nanjing